Greetham is a village in the East Lindsey district of Lincolnshire, England. The village is in the civil parish of Greetham with Somersby. To the west is High Toynton, and further to the north, Fulletby.

Greetham is listed in the 1086 Domesday Book with 56 households, which for the time was considered quite large,  of meadow, a mill and a church, with Hugh d'Avranches, 1st Earl of Chester as Lord of the Manor.

The church, dedicated to All Saints, is part of the Horncastle Group of churches. It is Grade II listed, dates from the 12th century, and was partly rebuilt in 1903, although the south aisle and tower have been demolished.

References

External links

"TF3070", Geograph.org.uk

Villages in Lincolnshire
East Lindsey District